Angelos Roufos (born 1852) was a Greek politician from Achaea.

He was born in 1852 in Patras to Benizelos Roufos, the scion of a well-established local political family. He was elected three times to the Greek Parliament. In 1899, he stood for election as mayor of Patras but lost because the family vote was divided between him and his brother Athanasios Kanakaris-Roufos.

References
''The first version of the article is translated and is based from the article at the Greek Wikipedia (el:Main Page)

1852 births
Politicians from Patras
Greek MPs 1879–1881
Year of death missing
Angelos